Mordellistena eversi is a species of beetle in the genus Mordellistena of the family Mordellidae. It was described in 1965 by Ermisch and is endemic to the Canary Islands.

References

eversi
Endemic fauna of the Canary Islands
Beetles described in 1965